Sabrina Labiod (born 17 June 1986) is a French-born Algerian former footballer who played as a midfielder. She has been a member of the Algeria women's national team.

Club career
Labiod has played for Toulouse FC and AS Muret in France.

International career
Labiod capped for Algeria at senior level during the 2014 African Women's Championship.

References

1986 births
Living people
Algerian women's footballers
Women's association football midfielders
Algeria women's international footballers
Footballers from Toulouse
French women's footballers
Toulouse FC (women) players
AS Muret players
Division 1 Féminine players
French sportspeople of Algerian descent